Maicon Thiago Pereira de Souza (born 14 September 1985), simply known as Maicon, is a Brazilian professional footballer who plays as a central midfielder.

Career
On 11 September 2009, Maicon signed for Figueirense, on loan from MSV Duisburg. He is a former player of Botafogo and Fluminense. After a good season with Figueirense, in December 2011, he signed with São Paulo.

São Paulo
Maicon came to São Paulo in December 2011, after shining for Figueirense. In that time, he said that lived "the best phase of career" and had "motivation" for going on at new club. He also said to be an athlete "that organizes the team, with good pass and who has good shoot".

Despite of his good performances in first season for Tricolor side, in whose season he scored twice in a derby against Corinthians, in a victory by 3–1, a game valid by Campeonato Brasileiro Série A, Maicon never was popular among fans, who never trusted about his footballer qualities.

In a hard 2013 season, when the team fought against relegation, Muricy Ramalho's coming changed Maicon's phase. Besides of taking off the club from relegation, Ramalho was fundamental for Maicon shines and, along with Paulo Henrique Ganso, another player who lived a bad shape, has become an important footballer for São Paulo's midfield. Ramalho also surprised about criticisms on Maicon. According to the coach, Maicon is a player "who knows how to play the game".

Honours
Fluminense
Taça Rio: 2005
Campeonato Carioca: 2005

Madureira
Taça Rio: 2006

São Paulo
Copa Sudamericana: 2012
 
Grêmio
Copa do Brasil: 2016
Copa Libertadores: 2017
Recopa Sudamericana: 2018
Campeonato Gaúcho: 2018, 2019, 2020, 2021
Recopa Gaúcha: 2019

References

External links

1985 births
Living people
Association football midfielders
Brazilian footballers
Madureira Esporte Clube players
Fluminense FC players
Bangu Atlético Clube players
Botafogo de Futebol e Regatas players
MSV Duisburg players
Figueirense FC players
São Paulo FC players
Grêmio Foot-Ball Porto Alegrense players
Campeonato Brasileiro Série A players
Campeonato Brasileiro Série B players
Bundesliga players
2. Bundesliga players
Brazilian expatriate footballers
Brazilian expatriate sportspeople in Germany
Expatriate footballers in Germany
Footballers from Rio de Janeiro (city)